Wipeout in the Zone is a party video game based on the American game show named Wipeout, made for the Xbox 360 with the Kinect. The game was published and distributed by Activision. It was released on December 25, 2010, in the United States.

See also
Wipeout (2008 U.S. game show)
Total Wipeout
Wipeout Canada
International versions of Wipeout
List of Kinect video games
List of Xbox 360 games
Lists of video games

Related video games
Wipeout: The Game
List of video games based on Wipeout (2008 U.S. game show)

References

Further reading

External links
Wipeout in the Zone at Amazon
Wipeout in the Zone at IGN
Wipeout in the Zone at GameStop
Wipeout in the Zone at GameSpot
Wipeout in the Zone at Metacritic
Wipeout in the Zone official trailer
Wipeout in the Zone IGN video review
Wipeout official site 

2010 video games
Activision games
Action video games
Party video games
North America-exclusive video games
Video games based on game shows
Video games developed in Chile
Kinect games
Xbox 360 games
Xbox 360-only games
In the Zone
Multiplayer and single-player video games
Behaviour Interactive games